Annesdale is a historic mansion in Memphis, Tennessee, United States.

History
The two-story mansion was completed in 1855. It was built for Dr Samuel Mansfield.

The mansion was purchased by Colonel Bogardus Snowden and his wife Annie Overton, the granddaughter of Judge John Overton. Their son, Robert Brinkley Snowden, became a real estate developer who lived at Ashlar Hall.

A bone fragment, possibly human, was found in June 2016 in the grate of a boarded-up fireplace. The fragment was sent to the morgue for further investigation.  The bone is very old and may date to the Civil War when Annesdale was used as a hospital.

Architectural significance
It has been listed on the National Register of Historic Places since November 25, 1980.

References

External links
Official site
Annesdale Mansion History

Houses on the National Register of Historic Places in Tennessee
Houses completed in 1855
Houses in Memphis, Tennessee
National Register of Historic Places in Memphis, Tennessee